The Ramesseum is the memorial temple (or mortuary temple) of Pharaoh Ramesses II ("Ramesses the Great", also spelled "Ramses" and "Rameses"). It is located in the Theban Necropolis in Upper Egypt, on the west of the River Nile, across from the modern city of Luxor. The name – or at least its French form Rhamesséion – was coined by Jean-François Champollion, who visited the ruins of the site in 1829 and first identified the hieroglyphs making up Ramesses's names and titles on the walls. It was originally called the House of millions of years of Usermaatra-setepenra that unites with Thebes-the-city in the domain of Amon.   Usermaatra-setepenra was the prenomen of Ramesses II.

History 
Ramesses II modified, usurped, or constructed many buildings from the ground up, and the most splendid of these, in accordance with New Kingdom royal burial practices, would have been his memorial temple: a place of worship dedicated to pharaoh, god on earth, where his memory would have been kept alive after his death. Surviving records indicate that work on the project began shortly after the start of his reign and continued for 20 years.

The design of Ramesses's mortuary temple adheres to the standard canons of New Kingdom temple architecture. Oriented northwest and southeast, the temple itself comprised two stone pylons (gateways, some 60 m wide), one after the other, each leading into a courtyard. Beyond the second courtyard, at the centre of the complex, was a covered 48-column hypostyle hall, surrounding the inner sanctuary. An enormous pylon stood before the first court, with the royal palace at the left and the gigantic statue of the king looming up at the back. As was customary, the pylons and outer walls were decorated with scenes commemorating the pharaoh's military victories and leaving due record of his dedication to, and kinship with, the gods. In Ramesses's case, much importance is placed on the Battle of Kadesh (ca. 1274 BC); more intriguingly, however, one block atop the first pylon records his pillaging, in the eighth year of his reign, a city called "Shalem", which may or may not have been Jerusalem. The scenes of the great pharaoh and his army triumphing over the Hittite forces fleeing before Kadesh, as portrayed in the canons of the "epic poem of Pentaur", can still be seen on the pylon.

This was alleged to have been transported  over land. This is the largest remaining colossal statue (except statues done in situ) in the world. However, fragments of four granite colossi of Ramesses were found in Tanis (northern Egypt) with an estimated height of 69 to 92 feet (21 to 28 meters). Like four of the six colossi of Amenhotep III (Colossi of Memnon), there are no longer complete remains, so the heights are based on unconfirmed estimates.

Remains of the second court include part of the internal façade of the pylon and a portion of the Osiride portico on the right. Scenes of war and the rout of the Hittites at Kadesh are repeated on the walls. In the upper registers, are shown a feast in honour of the phallic god Min, god of fertility. On the opposite side of the court the few Osiride pillars and columns still left furnish an idea of the original grandeur. Scattered remains of the two statues of the seated king which once flanked the entrance to the temple can also be seen, one in pink granite and the other in black granite. The head of one of these has been removed to the British Museum. Thirty-nine out of the forty-eight columns in the great hypostyle hall (41 x 31 m) still stand in the central rows. They are decorated with the usual scenes of the king before various gods. Part of the ceiling, decorated with gold stars on a blue, ground has also been preserved. The sons and daughters of Ramesses appear in the procession on the few walls left. The sanctuary was composed of three consecutive rooms, with eight columns and the tetrastyle cell. Part of the first room, with the ceiling decorated with astral scenes, and a few remains of the second room are all that is left.

Adjacent to the north of the hypostyle hall was a smaller temple; this was dedicated to Ramesses's mother, Tuya, and to his beloved chief wife, Nefertari. To the south of the first courtyard stood the temple palace. The complex was surrounded by various storerooms, granaries, workshops, and other ancillary buildings, some built as late as Roman times.

A temple of Seti I, of which nothing is now left but the foundations, once stood to the right of the hypostyle hall. It consisted of a peristyle court with two chapel shrines. The entire complex was surrounded by mudbrick walls which started at the gigantic southeast pylon.

A cache of papyri and ostraca dating back to the Third Intermediate Period (11th to 8th centuries BC) indicates that the temple was also the site of an important scribal school.

The site was in use before Ramesses had the first stone put in place: beneath the hypostyle hall, modern archaeologists have found a shaft tomb from the Middle Kingdom, yielding a rich hoard of religious and funerary artefacts.

Remains
 
Unlike the massive stone temples that Ramesses ordered carved from the face of the Nubian mountains at Abu Simbel, the inexorable passage of three millennia was not kind to his "temple of a million years" at Thebes. This was mostly due to its location on the very edge of the Nile floodplain, with the annual inundation gradually undermining the foundations of this temple and its neighbours. Neglect and the arrival of new faiths also took their toll: for example, in the early years of the Christian Era, the temple was put into service as a Christian church.

This is all standard fare for a temple of its kind built at that time. Leaving aside the escalation of scale – whereby each successive New Kingdom pharaoh strove to outdo his predecessors in volume and scope – the Ramesseum is largely cast in the same mould as Ramesses III's Medinet Habu or the ruined temple of Amenhotep III that stood behind the "Colossi of Memnon" a kilometre or so away. Instead, the significance that the Ramesseum enjoys today owes more to the time and manner of its rediscovery by Europeans.

The Ramesseum king list is a minor list of kings which still remain in situ on the few remains of the second pylon.

Excavation and studies

The origins of modern Egyptology can be traced to the arrival in Egypt of Napoleon Bonaparte in the summer of 1798. 
While undeniably an invasion by an alien imperialist power, this was nonetheless an invasion of its times, informed by Enlightenment ideas: alongside Napoleon's troops went men of science, the same whose toil under the desert sun would later yield the seminal 23-volume Description de l'Égypte. Two French engineers, Jean-Baptiste Prosper Jollois and Édouard de Villiers du Terrage, were assigned to study the Ramesseum site, and it was with much fanfare that they identified it with the "Tomb of Ozymandias" or "Palace of Memnon" of which Diodorus of Sicily had written in the 1st century BC.

The next visitor of note was Giovanni Belzoni, a showman and engineer of Italian origin and, latterly, an archaeologist and antiques dealer. Belzoni's travels took him in 1815 to Cairo, where he sold Mehemet Ali a hydraulic engine of his own invention. There he met British Consul General Henry Salt, who hired his services to collect from the temple in Thebes the so-called 'Younger Memnon', one of two colossal granite heads depicting Ramesses II, and transport it to England. Thanks to Belzoni's hydraulics and his skill as an engineer (Napoleon's men had failed in the same endeavour a decade or so earlier), the 7-ton stone head arrived in London in 1818, where it was dubbed "The Younger Memnon" and, some years later, given pride of place in the British Museum.

It was against the backdrop of intense excitement surrounding the statue's arrival, and having heard wondrous tales of other, less transportable treasures still in the desert, that the poet Percy Bysshe Shelley penned his sonnet "Ozymandias". In particular, one massive fallen statue at the Ramesseum is now inextricably linked with Shelley, because of the cartouche on its shoulder bearing Ramesses's throne name, User-maat-re Setep-en-re, the first part of which Diodorus transliterated into Greek as "Ozymandias". 
While Shelley's "vast and trunkless legs of stone" owe more to poetic license than to archaeology, the "half sunk... shattered visage" lying on the sand is an accurate description of part of the wrecked statue. The hands, and the feet, lie nearby. Were it still standing, the Ozymandias colossus would tower 19 m (62 ft) above the ground, rivalling the Colossi of Memnon and the statues of Ramesses carved into the mountain at Abu Simbel.

A joint French-Egyptian team has been exploring and restoring the Ramesseum and its environs since 1991. 
Among their discoveries during excavations include kitchens, bakeries and supply rooms for the temple to the south, and a school where boys were taught to be scribes to the southeast. Some of the challenges in preserving the area have been the control of modern Egyptian farmers using the area for farming and encroaching on the ruins.

Gallery

See also
Ramesseum magician's box
List of largest monoliths in the world

References

External links

University College London: Plan of the Ramesseum site
Ramesseum Digital Media Archive (photos, laser scans, panoramas), data from an Egyptian Supreme Council of Antiquities/CyArk research partnership
The Younger Memnon (British Museum)
Ozymandias (Shelley)
Ramesseum picture gallery at Remains.se
1830 drawing by Charles Franklin Head, at the Victoria and Albert Museum, London.

Buildings and structures completed in the 13th century BC
Open-air museums in Egypt
Theban Necropolis
Ramesses II